The 2020 Antrim Senior Hurling Championship was the 120th staging of the Antrim Senior Hurling Championship since its establishment by the Antrim County Board in 1901. The championship was postponed indefinitely due to the impact of the COVID-19 pandemic on Gaelic games, before eventually beginning on 9 August 2020 and ending on 13 September 2020.

Cúchulains Dunloy entered the championship as the defending champions.

The final was played on 13 September 2020 at Páirc Mac Uílín in Ballycastle, between Cúchulains Dunloy and Loughgiel Shamrocks, in what was their first meeting in a final in eight years. Cúchulains Dunloy won the match by 2–20 to 2–12 to claim their 14th championship title overall and a second successive title.

Results

Knockout stage

Quarter-finals

Semi-finals

Final

References

Antrim Senior Hurling Championship
Antrim Senior Hurling Championship
Antrim Senior Hurling Championship